Maccabi Sulam is an Arab-Israeli football club based in Sulam.

History
The club was founded in 2011 and registered to play in Liga Gimel, where it was placed in the Jezreel division. The club played in this division for the following two seasons, until it was promoted at the end of the 2012–13 season, after winning a promotion playoff match against Beitar Kafr Kanna.

References

External links
Maccabi Sulam The Israel Football Association 

Sulam
Association football clubs established in 2011
2011 establishments in Israel
Maccabi football clubs